Cocos  may refer to:

Geography
 Cocos, Bahia, Brazil
 Cocos, Quebradillas, Puerto Rico, a barrio
 Cocos Island (disambiguation)
 Cocos (Keeling) Islands, a territory of Australia in the Indian Ocean
 Shire of Cocos, a local government area
 Cocos Lagoon, south of Guam
 Cocos Plate, a tectonic plate beneath the Pacific Ocean
 rivers in Romania:
 Cocoș, a tributary of the Aita in Covasna County
 Cocoș (Constanța), a river in Constanța County
 Cocoș, a tributary of the Ilișoara Mare in Mureș County

Biology
 Cocos (plant), a plant genus with the coconut as its only accepted living species
 Eoophyla cocos, a moth of family Crambidae
 Macrosporium cocos, a fungus of family Pleosporaceae
 Pseudoepicoccum cocos, a fungus of family Incertae sedis

People
 Cocos Malays, an ethnic group inhabiting the Cocos (Keeling) Islands
 Orang Cocos, an ethnic group in Malaysia descended from Cocos Malay immigrants
 Roxana Cocoș (born 1989), Romanian weightlifter

Other uses
 Battle of Cocos, 1914 naval battle near the Cocos (Keeling) Islands
 Cocos2d, an open source software framework
 Coco's Bakery, a chain of restaurants in the western United States
 Cocoș Monastery, Isaccea, Romania

See also
 Coco (disambiguation)
 Coconut (disambiguation)